Veronika Sramaty (born 1977 in Czechoslovakia), as artist she is interested in various media, but mostly she is involved with media of painting related to classic concept of historical painting as well as its influence of neo-conceptual tendencies. She is the author of the artistic project The Top Ten (which include 10 gouache paintings on paper and catalogue).

Veronika Šramatyová is an author belonging to the distinctive personalities of the younger generation. The characteristic feature of her work are the neo-conceptual tendencies in painting. She is interested in the connection of the two media, painting and photography, constantly exploring and analysing them. She often thematises the borders between the artist and the gallery or viewer and an artwork. Besides neo-conceptual tendencies, the artist shows a constant interest in the medium of painting, using its photo-realistic language, through which she articulates other meanings and layers, as can be seen in her painting project Entries (AKA Project 19). At the exhibition This is my place (Banská Bystrica, 2003), she presented 19 photo-realistic paintings of the entries or gates to all the houses she has ever lived in. Their small scale, framing and technical presentation create a series of impersonal documentary, non-nostalgic photographs.

The Top Ten Project
Veronika Sramaty in her current (2014/2015) painter´s cycle (project) The Top Ten focuses on portraiture and self-portraiture with ten great players of the art market according to the magazine Forbes. The author in her thematic series of gouache paintings reacts to the media value of the information the magazine Forbes provided in March 2012 when they published the list of the ten best art dealers in the form of a picture report. Sramaty in her project The Top Ten semantically achieves a visual idiom – using her authorial intervention she created an unreal scenario in the real world, while at the same time the result is not an imagination or a virtual world of gamer´s type. In the series of gauche paintings however, she resigns from pathos of large formats of current art and adheres to the photographic size 3.34 x 4.92 in (8,5 x 12,5 cm). It is very refreshing that her photorealistic painting in the postmedia and postconceptual age once again introduces idea, sketch, counterfeit and manipulated photography to benefit humor. Through this it directly denies the widespread emptiness of meaning in art. At the same time she offers, using her own devices (both painterly and photographic) a dreamy, but also realistic, manipulated view of an artist from Europe, establishing herself in the fast changing rules of the American art market. Veronika Sramaty presents herself in the gauche paintings as a friend of the individual people involved in beneficent brunches, exhibit openings, afterparties, and staged formal photographs of gallerists – simply in spaces where the art is not created but rather distributed.

Studies
2005 – 2010 Postgraduate study (degree ArtD.), Academy of Fine Arts and Design in Bratislava (prof. Daniel Fischer), Slovak Republic
1996 – 2003 Academy of Fine Arts and Design in Bratislava, Department of Painting and Other Media (prof. Daniel Fischer, prof. Ilona Németh DLA), Slovak Republic

Solo exhibitions
2016 Periférne centrá Dúbravica, Projekt Jednota No.3., Dúbravica (BB), Slovak Republic
2016 Attributes of Metaphors and Intuition of Mind Galéria 19, Bratislava, Slovak Republic
2015 The Top Ten, Soda Gallery, Bratislava,  Slovak Republic
2014 Landscape, Flatgallery, Bratislava,  Slovak Republic
2013 About the Importance of Forgetfulness, The ArtWall Project Space, Athens, Greece
2010 Hard Work/Clean Work, Central Slovakian Gallery, Banská Bystrica,  Slovak Republic
2010 Barter Collection, Soda Gallery, Bratislava,  Slovak Republic
2008 Hobby Painting, Room 19_21 Central Slovakian Gallery, Banská Bystrica,  Slovak Republic
2007 Jungen Slovakinnen (with M. Nociarová-Rázusová and R. Prokop), Greilleinstein, Austria
2004 Come and Win!, HIT Gallery, Bratislava,  Slovak Republic
2003 Medium (with B. Balážová, J. Triaška), Medium Gallery, Bratislava,  Slovak Republic
2001 Artoday (with A. Mona Chisa), Buryzone, Bratislava,  Slovak Republic

Group exhibitions
 2019 Statek Robinsona, Muzeum Architektury, Wroclaw, Poland
 2018 Total Romantic. Contemporary Imagery in the World of Women Painters, Jan Koniarek Gallery in Trnava, Trnava, Slovak Republic
 2017 Wratislavia Pro Bratislava / Bratislava Pro Wratislavia, Galeria Miejska, Wroclaw, Poland
 2016 Landscapes, Bartók Gallery, Budapest, Hungary
 2015 Export, Krokus Contemporary Art Gallery, Bratislava, Slovak Republic
 2015 A Touch of California, Nástupište 1-12, Topoľčany, Slovak Republic
 2015 Art has no Alternative, Tranzit Gallery, Bratislava, Slovak Republic
 2014 I Came, I Saw, ..., Apricity Gallery, Santa Cruz, California, United States 
 2014 7th New Zlín Salon, Regional Gallery of Fine Arts in Zlín, Czech Republic
 2013 Home Sweet Home, Soda Gallery, Bratislava, Slovakia 
 2013 Zero Years – Nullerjahre, Freies Museum, Berlin, Germany
 2013 Auf Der Strecke, Stadtgalerie Bern, Bern, Switzerland 
 2013 First Exhibition, Kunsthalle Lab, Bratislava, Slovakia
 2013 ArtD.No1, Art House, Bratislava, Slovakia
 2013 Suspicious Free Time, Open Gallery, Bratislava, Slovakia
 2012 Delete. Art and Wipping Out, Slovak National Gallery, Slovakia
 2011 Zero Years, Slovak art 1999–2011, Art House, Bratislava, Slovakia
 2011 Painting 2011, Ministry of Culture, Bratislava, Slovakia
 2011 Manual for the perfect Viewer, Nitra Gallery, Nitra, Slovakia
 2010 Painting After Painting, Slovak National Gallery, Bratislava, Slovakia
 2009 Traps Of Visual Illusion – Contemporary Forms Of Trompe'l Oeil, Nitra Gallery, Nitra, Slovakia
 2009 Perfect Asymmetry II., Donumenta, Städtische Galerie „Leerer Beutel“, Regensburg, Germany
 2009 Plus Minus XXI , Art House, Bratislava, Slovakia 
 2009 Contact, City Hall Gallery, Oslo, Norway 
 2008 Slovak Picture [Anti-Picture], Riding school, Prague Castle, Czech Republic 
 2008 Case History, Central Slovakian Gallery, Banská Bystrica, Slovakia
 2008 Close Encounters, Soho in Ottakring, Wien, Austria
 2008 Essl Award 2007, Kunstforum Ostdeutsche Galerie, Regensburg, Germany
 2007 Essl Award 2007, Essl Museum, Klosterneuburg - Wien, Austria
 2006 Transfer, Museum of Contemporary Art in Vojvodina, Novi Sad, Serbia 
 2006 Runaway, SPACE / Gallery Priestor for Contemporary Arts, Bratislava, Slovakia 
 2006 22 Minutes 50,28 Seconds, University Library, Jyväskylä, Finland
 2006 22 Minutes 50,28 Seconds, CAISA Center, Helsinki, Finland
 2005 Draught in contemporary Slovak painting 2000–2005, City Gallery Prague, Czech Republic 
 2005 White Greetings for Belarus, National Art Museum of The Belarus, Minsk, Belarus 
 2005 Prague Biennale 2 (New Slovak Scene), Karlín Hall, Prague, Czech Republic
 2004 Re:Location Academy/Shake Society, Casino Luxembourg – Forum d´art Contemporain, Luxembourg 
 2004 Mak Nite. Europa Jetzt, Action with HIT Gallery, MAK in Vienna, Austria 
 2004 Media Factory, Zsolnay Factory, Pécz, Hungary 
 2003 This is My Place (1), Central Slovakian Gallery, Banská Bystrica, Slovakia
 2003 Czechoslovakia, Slovak National Museum, Bratislava, Slovakia 
 2002 TRANZart disLOCATED, Mediawave Foundation, Győr (Hungary), At Home Gallery Foundation, Šamorín (Slovakia), Maszk Association, Szeged (Hungary), Kibla Multimedia Centre, Maribor (Slovenia), Tranzit Foundation, Cluj (Romania) 
 2002 Slovak Contemporary Art - Space Gallery, Artforum Berlin, Germany

Publishing Art Projects
2014 The Top Ten, Catalogue, Self-published, Slovak Republic 
2010 Veronika Šramatyová, Catalogue, Self-published, Slovak Republic
2009 Untitled, Book of Poetry. Publisher: Ars Poetica, Slovak Republic
2003 Come and Win! Catalogue, Self-published, Slovak Republic

Collections
Residency.ch, Progr Zentrum Fur Kulturproduction, Bern, Switzerland
Slovak National Gallery, Bratislava, Slovak Republic
Central Slovakian Gallery, Banská Bystrica, Slovak Republic
Nitra Gallery, Nitra, Slovak Republic
For Public Collection In Slovak Republic see www.webumenia.sk
Museum of Contemporary Arts, Novi Sad, Serbia
Private Collections USA, Europe

References

External links
Veronika Sramaty on Artalk.cz on project The Top Ten
Veronika Sramatyova exhibition in Schemnitz Gallery
Collection of Nitra Gallery, Nitra, Slovak Republic
Artycok.tv On her project Barter Collection
Hentak.sk essay by Denisa Gura Doričová on Group Exhibition Photography or Painting?
Profil Contemporary Art Magazine 4/2013 interview by Katarina Slaninová interview with Veronika Sramaty in English and slovak
Umělec 3/03, Divus, Prague, p. 76. article by Mira Keratová, 
Artfacts.net

1977 births
Living people
People from Zvolen
Slovak painters
Contemporary painters
20th-century women artists
Slovak women artists